Neustadt in Holstein (Holsatian: Niestadt in Holsteen) is a town in the district of Ostholstein, in Schleswig-Holstein, Germany, on the Bay of Lübeck 30 km northeast of Lübeck, and 50 km southeast of Kiel.

History
In World War II, subcamp Number 1049 Neustadt in Holstein/Schleswig-Holstein was part of the Neuengamme concentration camp.
The sinking of several ships, including SS Cap Arcona, occurred to the south, in the bay, in the closing hours of WWII.  Almost 7,000 concentration camp victims were killed on two ships, drowned swimming in 45 F water towards the lighthouse Pelzerhaken shore, or shot by the SS upon reaching shore.  A third, the Deutschland, had all survivors.

Economy
Peter Deilmann Cruises was headquartered in Neustadt in Holstein.

Nature
The Neustädter Binnenwasser a brackish water lake borders Neustadt to the northwest.

References

External links 

Populated coastal places in Germany (Baltic Sea)
Neuengamme concentration camp
Ostholstein